Clotilde Micheli (11 September 1849 - 24 March 1911) was an Italian Roman Catholic professed religious who established the order known as the Sisters of Angels; she assumed the new name of "Maria Serafina of the Sacred Heart" upon the order's foundation and her profession into it. She had once before been part of a religious order in which she received the name of "Maria Annunziata" but discarded it when she left their ranks.

Micheli was beatified in Benevento in 2011 after Pope Benedict XVI granted approval for her beatification to take place. Cardinal Angelo Amato presided over the celebration on the behalf of the pontiff.

Life
Clotilde Micheli was born in Imer, Austrian Empire on 11 September 1849. She received Confirmation at the age of three in 1852 from the Bishop of Trent Johann Nepomuk von Tschiderer zu Gleifheim.

During her childhood she reported having her first apparition in which her guardian angel came to her with an invitation from the Blessed Mother to consecrate herself as a virgin to her. She had her First Communion in 1858 at the age of nine and after this felt a strong pull to the religious life; she spent her nights in long periods of adoration to the Eucharist. As a child she received her education from her mother who instilled in her a sense of virtue and the fundamental Christian ethics. On the night of 2 August 1867 - in the parish church of her hometown - the Blessed Mother appeared with angels around her and showed her that it was Micheli's mission to found a religious congregation that would have as its crucial aim the adoration of God and Jesus Christ as the spirit under her patronage.

Micheli received the consolation of a friend and went to Venice for the spiritual guidance of Domenico Agostini - future cardinal and Patriarch of Venice - who advised her to draft a Rule; she was frightened at the prospect of this and believed she had no inspiration so returned in sadness to her hometown having written nothing. Micheli relocated to Padua in 1867 close to the priest Angelo Piacentini whom she confided her doubts to. She remained under his spiritual direction until his death in 1876; in 1878 she realized that her parents - without her knowledge - was in the process of arranging a marriage for her. Her response to this was to flee to Epfendorf in the German Kingdom. Micheli remained there until 1885 where she worked as a nurse in a clinic that the Elizabethan Sisters ran. However her mother died in 1883 and her father followed in 1885 around the time she left Epfendorf for her hometown and remained there alone until 1887 when she decided to discern her project for a congregation.

Alongside her niece Giuditta she - in May 1887 - set out on foot for a pilgrimage to Rome and made it an objective to stop at all Marian sanctuaries along the route as a means of receiving further inspiration for her project. In August she arrived in Rome and joined the order known as the Suore Immacolatine; she took the habit and received the name of "Maria Annunziata". She remained with that order until 1891 and served as the Mother Superior of a convent in the village of Sgurgola in the Diocese of Anagni. She came to know the Franciscan priest Francesco Fusco da Trani while she was in Assisi during her pilgrimage and he wrote to her in order to advise her to leave her order and go to Piedimonte d'Alife where the bishop Antonio Scotti had plans for an order of his own. However upon meeting Scotti she realized their plans were not at all similar.

Micheli then travelled to Caserta and - alongside the nun Filomena Scaringi - remained in a household with people who provided her with both material and spiritual support. She set her own house in Casolla with two women and led to the Bishop of Caserta Enrico De Rossi authorizing the small congregation Micheli had established as the Sisters of the Angels on 28 June 1891. She discarded her previous religious name and took the name of "Maria Serafina of the Sacred Heart". During her lifetime her order flourished with a total of fifteen houses being established. The order would later spread elsewhere to places such as Indonesia and Benin. A house in Faicchio opened in June 1899 as a place for formation.

She became quite ill in 1895 - almost close to death - and refused herself medical treatment. Instead she was moved elsewhere for a period of rest in order to recover from her illness. On one particular occasion a seminarian - whom Satan had possessed - arrived in the garden adjacent to the convent and asked for her. The sisters did not want to fatigue Micheli so said she wasn't there; the seminarian knew this was a lie and began to inveigh against the sisters in an inhuman voice. Micheli then approached and demanded he be quiet to which the voice said: "You are damned!"; the sisters inquired about the demons present to which the inhuman voice said: "we are seven". Micheli took the seminarian aside to listen to him and then applied both holy water and the sign of the Cross on him - this succeeded in driving the devils out of him and was a successful exorcism.

Micheli died on 24 March 1911. Her remains are interred in Faicchio.

Beatification
The beatification process commenced on 9 July 1990 after the Congregation for the Causes of Saints - under Pope John Paul II - declared "nihil obstat" (nothing against) to the cause which also granted her the posthumous title of Servant of God. The diocesan process spanned from 1 October 1990 until 15 March 1992 and saw the thorough investigation of her life as well as the visions that she was prone to. Upon the closure of this process all documentation was submitted to Roman officials for investigation on their end; the so-called "Roman Phase" commenced on 2 July 1993 after the diocesan process was cleared of having done its work according to the set criteria.

The postulation compiled and submitted the Positio to Rome for further investigation while the large dossier included biographical details as well as attesting to the manner in which she led her life according to Christian values. This also had to face the historical commission on 14 January 2003 who had to determine whether or not there were obstacles to the cause; the historians approved it and thus would allow the cause to continue.

On 3 July 2009 she was conferred the title of Venerable after Pope Benedict XVI acknowledged the fact that Micheli had practiced a model Christian life of heroic virtue - both cardinal and theological.

The process for the miracle required for her beatification opened on 28 November 2003 in the diocese of its origin and closed on 25 January 2005; it was then submitted to Roman officials for further investigation and received formal ratification on 20 May 2005. The Rome-based medical board met in order to discuss if the healing was indeed a credible miracle and approved it after meeting on 3 December 2009 while consulting theologians approved it on 26 March 2010; the Congregation for the Causes of Saints followed suit on 8 June 2010 and passed it to Benedict XVI for his approval on 1 July 2010.

Micheli received beatification on 28 May 2011 in Benevento; Cardinal Angelo Amato presided over the beatification on the behalf of Benedict XVI.

The current postulator assigned to the cause is Giuseppina Romano.

References

External links
Hagiography Circle
Saints SQPN
Sisters of Angels
Sister Maria Serafina of the Sacred Heart

1849 births
1911 deaths
19th-century venerated Christians
19th-century Italian Roman Catholic religious sisters and nuns
19th-century Christian mystics
20th-century venerated Christians
20th-century Christian mystics
Angelic visionaries
Beatifications by Pope Benedict XVI
Roman Catholic mystics
Founders of Catholic religious communities
20th-century Italian Roman Catholic religious sisters and nuns
Italian beatified people
Marian visionaries
People from Trento
Austro-Hungarian people
Venerated Catholics by Pope Benedict XVI